Yael Ravia-Zadok is the deputy director-general and head of the Economic Diplomacy Division at the Israel Ministry of Foreign Affairs, who served as the Ambassador to Cyprus from 2015 until 2017.

References

Ambassadors of Israel to Cyprus
Israeli women ambassadors
Year of birth missing (living people)
Living people